White-lipped python may refer to:

 Leiopython albertisii, a.k.a. D'Albert's water python, a non-venomous species found in New Guinea
 Liasis mackloti, a.k.a. Macklot's python, a non-venomous species found in Indonesia

Animal common name disambiguation pages